"Sad Movies (Make Me Cry)" is a 1961 pop song by the American singer Sue Thompson. The song was written by John D. Loudermilk and appears on Thompson's 1962 Hickory Records album Meet Sue Thompson.

Background
Although Thompson was in her thirties when she recorded "Sad Movies", her singing style and young-sounding voice appealed to many of the Baby Boomers whose influence was starting to become apparent on the US music charts. Loudermilk was inspired to write the song after a girlfriend of his went to see the 1960 film Spartacus: "After the movie went off, they turned the bright lights on, and it was just an ambience killer. The person I was with had tears in her eyes and said, 'Sad movies make me cry'."

Chart performance
Released as a single in 1961, "Sad Movies (Make Me Cry)" was Thompson's first song to appear on the Billboard Hot 100 chart, where it peaked at number five in October. The song also reached the top of the Billboard Easy Listening chart, which had been created earlier in 1961, and was the second song by a female vocalist to top the list. In Australia, the song topped out at number six on the Kent Music Report, while in the United Kingdom, it peaked at number 46 on the UK Singles Chart.

Cover versions
Other artists who have covered the song include:
At the same time (as Thompson's recording), in 1961, French pop singer Sylvie Vartan recorded the song version ("Quand le film est triste"). One year later, in 1962, Québec pop singer Michèle Richard recorded the same song in French ("Quand le film est triste").
The Lennon Sisters also recorded a version of "Sad Movies" in 1961 which peaked at number 56 on the Billboard Hot 100 and number 13 on the Easy Listening chart.
Brazilian group Trio Esperança, who recorded in 1962 a version called "Filme Triste", with words written by Romeu Nunes.
British pop singer Carol Deene (whose version of the song charted at number 44 on the UK Singles Chart).
In 1971, it was recorded by the Filipino singer Vilma Santos.
In 1981, it was recorded by the German disco group Boney M.
A Chinese version entitled "握别的时候" was recorded by Taiwanese singer 风飞飞 in 1983.
A Spanish version by Queta Garay entitled "Las caricaturas me hacen llorar".
Jamaican songbird Cynthia Schloss, performed a well-known Reggae version of the song with U Brown.

See also
List of Top 25 singles for 1961 in Australia
List of number-one adult contemporary singles of 1961 (U.S.)

References

1961 singles
Sue Thompson songs
Boney M. songs
Songs written by John D. Loudermilk
1961 songs